Route 11 is a highway in the northern part of the U.S. state of Missouri.  Its northern terminus is at Route 15 near Baring; its southern terminus is at U.S. Route 24 west of Brunswick.  The northern half of the route runs more east–west than north–south.

Junction list

References

External Links

011
Transportation in Chariton County, Missouri
Transportation in Linn County, Missouri
Transportation in Adair County, Missouri
Transportation in Knox County, Missouri